Heidi Rakels (born 22 June 1968 in Leuven, Flemish Brabant) is a retired female judoka from Belgium.

Rakels claimed the bronze medal in the Women's Middleweight (– 66 kg) division at the 1992 Summer Olympics in Barcelona, Spain. In the bronze medal match she defeated Germany's Alexandra Schreiber. She also competed at the 2000 Summer Olympics in Sydney, Australia.

References

1968 births
Living people
Belgian female judoka
Judoka at the 1992 Summer Olympics
Judoka at the 2000 Summer Olympics
Olympic judoka of Belgium
Olympic bronze medalists for Belgium
Sportspeople from Leuven
Olympic medalists in judo
Medalists at the 1992 Summer Olympics
20th-century Belgian women